This is a list of the vice premiers of the People's Republic of China since 1949.

In the People's Republic of China premiers elected by delegation of the National People's Congress every five years also are limited to two terms.

List of vice premiers 
The vice premiership of the PRC was created since the establishment of the People's Republic of China on 1 October 1949.

 Generations of leadership

See also 

 List of premiers of the People's Republic of China
 List of presidents of the People's Republic of China

.
.
Vice-premiers